The canton of Signy-l'Abbaye is an administrative division of the Ardennes department, northern France. Its borders were modified at the French canton reorganisation which came into effect in March 2015. Its seat is in Signy-l'Abbaye.

It consists of the following communes:

Antheny
Aouste
Aubigny-les-Pothées
Auboncourt-Vauzelles
Barbaise
Blanchefosse-et-Bay
Bossus-lès-Rumigny
Cernion
Champlin
Chappes
Chaumont-Porcien
Chesnois-Auboncourt
Clavy-Warby
Dommery
Doumely-Bégny
Draize
L'Échelle
Estrebay
Faissault
Faux
La Férée
Flaignes-Havys
Fraillicourt
Le Fréty
Girondelle
Givron
Grandchamp
Gruyères
Hagnicourt
Hannappes
Jandun
Justine-Herbigny
Lalobbe
Launois-sur-Vence
Lépron-les-Vallées
Liart
Logny-Bogny
Lucquy
Maranwez
Marby
Marlemont
Mesmont
Montmeillant
Neufmaison
La Neuville-lès-Wasigny
Neuvizy
Novion-Porcien
Prez
Puiseux
Raillicourt
Remaucourt
Renneville
Rocquigny
La Romagne
Rouvroy-sur-Audry
Rubigny
Rumigny
Saint-Jean-aux-Bois
Saulces-Monclin
Sery
Signy-l'Abbaye
Sorcy-Bauthémont
Thin-le-Moutier
Vaux-lès-Rubigny
Vaux-Montreuil
Vaux-Villaine
Viel-Saint-Remy
Villers-le-Tourneur
Wagnon
Wasigny
Wignicourt

References

Cantons of Ardennes (department)